The Kielce cemetery massacre refers to the shooting action by the Nazi German police that took place on May 23, 1943 in occupied Poland during World War II, in which 45 Jewish children who had survived the Kielce Ghetto liquidation, and remained with their working parents at the Kielce forced-labour camps, were rounded up and brought to the Pakosz cemetery in Kielce, Poland, where they were murdered by the German paramilitary police. The children ranged in age from 15 months to 15 years old.

During the ghetto liquidation action which began on 20 August 1942 approximately 20,000-21,000 Jews were led to awaiting Holocaust trains and sent to Treblinka extermination camp. By the end of 24 August 1942, there were only 2,000 skilled workers left alive in the labour camp at Stolarska-and-Jasna Streets (pl) within the small ghetto, including members of the Judenrat and the Jewish policemen. In May 1943, most Jewish prisoners from Kielce were transported to forced-labour camps in Starachowice, Skarżysko-Kamienna, Pionki, and Bliżyn. The 45 Jewish children murdered at the cemetery were the ones who stayed behind at the liquidated camp.

References

1943 crimes in Poland
Kielce
Holocaust massacres and pogroms in Poland
General Government
May 1943 events
Massacres in 1943